Anna-Karin Strömstedt Olsson (born 1 January 1981, in Mora, Dalarna) is a retired Swedish cross-country skier and biathlete who has competed since 1998. Her lone World Cup victory was in a 4 × 5 km relay event in Switzerland in 2007.

At the 2006 Winter Olympics in Turin, Strömstedt Olsson finished fourth in the 4 × 5 km relay, 30th in the 30 km, and 47th in the 7.5 km + 7.5 km double pursuit events. At the FIS Nordic World Ski Championships 2007 in Sapporo, she finished 40th in the 7.5 km + 7.5 km double pursuit event and did not finish the 30 km event.

Cross-country skiing results
All results are sourced from the International Ski Federation (FIS).

Olympic Games

World Championships

World Cup

Season standings

Team podiums
 1 victory – (1 ) 
 2 podiums – (1 , 1 )

References

External links

1981 births
Living people
People from Vansbro Municipality
Cross-country skiers from Dalarna County
Cross-country skiers at the 2006 Winter Olympics
Olympic cross-country skiers of Sweden
Swedish female cross-country skiers
Swedish female biathletes